Dash Almalu (also Romanized as Dāsh Ālmālū; also known as Ālmālū Dāsh) is a village in Yengejeh Rural District, Howmeh District, Azarshahr County, East Azerbaijan Province, Iran. At the 2006 census, its population was 788, in 148 families.

References 

Populated places in Azarshahr County